The country calling code of Bosnia and Herzegovina is +387.

Bosnia and Herzegovina received the +387 code following the breakup of the Socialist Federal Republic of Yugoslavia in 1992, whose country code was previously +38.

An example for calling telephones in Sarajevo, Bosnia and Herzegovina is as follows:

 0 33 xxx xxx (within Sarajevo)
 0 33 xxx xxx (within Bosnia and Herzegovina)
 +387 33 xxx xxx (outside of Bosnia and Herzegovina)

This is a list of dialing codes in Bosnia and Herzegovina.

Fixed telephony areas

Calling code areas in the Federation of Bosnia and Herzegovina

Calling code areas in the Brčko District

Calling code areas in Republika Srpska

Nomad numbers in Bosnia and Herzegovina

Mobile phone codes 
Calling codes in the table are assigned to new customers by the respective provider. However, it has been possible to change the operator and retain the old calling code (along with the rest of the phone number) since 2013.

References

Special codes 
The following special telephone numbers are valid across the country:
 112   –  General emergency
 121   –  Civil protection
 122   –  Police
 123   –  Fire Department
 124   –  Ambulance
 125   –  Exact time
 1202  –  Telegram service 
 1206  –  Military police
1208  – Union of consumers in BiH 
1261  – SOS hotline for prevention of human trafficking
1262  – Search and rescue services of BiH 
1264  – SOS hotline for RS entity Gender center
1265  – SOS hotline for victims of family violence

Road assistance numbers
1282  – BIHAMK (Bosnia and Herzegovina Automobile and Motorcycle Club)
1285  – AMSRS (Automobile and Motorcycle Association of Republika Srpska entity)
1288  – AAMKBIH (Association Automobile and Motorcycle of Bosnia and Herzegovina)

Telephone Number Directory
1182  – Local Telephone Number Directory of BH Telecom
1183  – International Telephone Number Directory of BH Telecom 
1185  – Local Telephone Number Directory of Telekom Srpske
1186  – International Telephone Number Directory of Telekom Srpske 
1188  – Local Telephone Number Directory of HT Eronet
1266  – International Telephone Number Directory of HT Eronet
1272  – Report a fault in the telephone line for BH Telecom customers
0800 50000 option 1  – Report a fault in the telephone line for Telekom Srpske customers
1488  – Report a fault in the telephone line for HT Eronet customers
17030  – Charity Numbers (NVO Otvorena mreža Bosne i Hercegovine)
17050  – Charity Numbers (NVO Otvorena mreža Bosne i Hercegovine)
1400  – Calling at a specified time
1401  – Wake-up service (Set time)
1402  – Wake-up service (Checking the settings)
1403  – Wake-up service (Cancellation of the last settings)
1404  – Wake-up service (Cancellation of all settings)
1405  – Test of phone device
1417  – Express Mail Services BH Pošta 
1371  – Express Mail Services Pošte Srpske
1323  – Express Mail Services Hrvatska pošta Mostar

Taxi services numbers
1500, 1517, 1518 – Taxi Tuzla (Tuzla)
1515  – Sarajevo Taxi (Sarajevo)
1516  – Samir-Emir Taxi (Sarajevo)
1521  – Holand company Taxi (Sarajevo)
1522  – Paja Taxi (Sarajevo)
1533 (Banja Luka), 1552 (Bijeljina)  – Patrol Taxi
1545  – Ideal Taxi (Banja Luka)
1551  – Maxi Taxi (Banja Luka)

1555  – Euro Taxi (Banja Luka)
1526  – Alo Taxi (Trebinje)

Toll-free telephone number
Toll-free numbers by operators in Bosnia and Herzegovina:
 0800 8xxxx – HT Eronet
 0800 2xxxx – BH Telecom
 0800 5xxxx – Telekom Srpske
0800 20002  – Landline technical support for BH Telecom customers 
0800 50000  – Landline technical support for Telekom Srpske customers 
0800 88888  – Landline technical support for HT Eronet customers

History 

Bosnia and Herzegovina once was a part of Yugoslavia. While the international prefix for Yugoslavia was +38, places in Bosnia and Herzegovina were assigned phonecodes (and postcodes) beginning with 7 and 8. If the phonecode of a city was 0xx, the appropriate postcode was xx000. These postcodes are still valid.

Note: the codes listed below are now all obsolete. However, they are still used at times to identify places in Bosnia and Herzegovina, particularly 071 (Sarajevo), 078 (Banja Luka) and 075 (Tuzla).

References

Updated Service Numbers - HT NET

External links
Communications Regulatory Agency of Bosnia and Herzegovina (CRA)

Bosnia and Herzegovina
Communications in Bosnia and Herzegovina
Bosnia and Herzegovina communications-related lists